Nasher may refer to:

 Nasher clan, an Afghan family of the Kharoti (Ghilzai) tribe
 Nasher Museum of Art at Duke University
 Nasher Sculpture Center, a museum in Dallas, Texas
 Nasher Alagondar, a fictional character in the Neverwinter Nights video games

People
 Sher Khan Nasher (1870–1935), Khan and industrialist
 Gholam Serwar Nasher (1919–1984), Khan and industrialist
 Gholam Nabi Nasher (1926–2010), Afghan statesman
 Gholam Rabani Nasher, Afghan statesman
 Farhad Darya Nasher (born 1962), singer and composer
 Jack Nasher, business psychologist
Homayon Nashir, Business Entrepreneur, Live Music Promoter - Producer, Consulting, 
 Brian Nash (aka Nasher Nash), British musician